The Roman Catholic Archdiocese of Indianapolis is a division of the Roman Catholic Church in the United States. When it was originally erected as the Diocese of Vincennes on May 6, 1834, it encompassed all of Indiana as well as the eastern third of Illinois. It was renamed the Diocese of Indianapolis on March 28, 1898. Bishop Francis Silas Chatard, who had been living in Indianapolis since 1878 when he was appointed Bishop of Vincennes, became the first Bishop of Indianapolis. It was elevated from a diocese to a metropolitan archdiocese on October 21, 1944.

Per the 2000 census, the archdiocese contained 2,430,606 people, 233,273 of whom were Catholic.  The archdiocese covers 39 counties in central and southern Indiana, with a total area of 13,757 square miles. Charles Thompson has been the Archbishop of Indianapolis since 2017.

Bishops

Bishops of Vincennes
  Simon Bruté de Rémur (1834–1839)
  Célestine Guynemer de la Hailandière (1839–1847)
  John Stephen Bazin (1847–1848)
  Jacques-Maurice De Saint Palais (1848–1877)

Bishops of Indianapolis
  Francis Silas Chatard (1878–1918)
  Joseph Chartrand (1918-1933; coadjutor bishop 1910–1918)
  Joseph Ritter (1934-1944), elevated to Archbishop
(John T. McNicholas, O.P. was appointed in 1925; did not take effect.)

Archbishops of Indianapolis
  Joseph Ritter (1944–1946), appointed Archbishop of Saint Louis (Cardinal in 1961)
  Paul C. Schulte (1946–1970)
  George Biskup (1970–1979; coadjutor archbishop 1967–1970)
  Edward T. O'Meara (1979–1992)
  Daniel M. Buechlein, O.S.B. (1992–2011)
  Cardinal Joseph William Tobin, C.Ss.R. (2012–2017), appointed Archbishop of Newark while he was Cardinal-designate
 Charles C. Thompson (2017–present)

Auxiliary bishops
  Denis O'Donaghue (1900–1910), appointed Bishop of Louisville
  Joseph Ritter (1933–1934), appointed Bishop and later Archbishop of Indianapolis (see above); future Cardinal
  Christopher J. Coyne (2011–2015), appointed Bishop of Burlington

Other priests of this diocese who became bishops
Herman Joseph Alerding, appointed Bishop of Fort Wayne in 1900
Emmanuel Boleslaus Ledvina, appointed Bishop of Corpus Christi in 1921
Alphonse John Smith, appointed Bishop of Nashville in 1923
Gerald Andrew Gettelfinger, appointed Bishop of Evansville in 1989
Paul Etienne, appointed Bishop of Cheyenne in 2009, Archbishop of Anchorage in 2016, Coadjutor Archbishop of Seattle in 2019 and subsequently succeeded to latter see

History
Before the Archdiocese of Indianapolis was erected in 1944, the episcopal see passed through three other ecclesiastical jurisdictions: the Diocese of Quebec, Canada, until 1789; the Diocese of Baltimore, Maryland, from 1789 to 1808; and the Diocese of Bardstown, Kentucky, from 1808 to 1834. The archdiocese was the Diocese of Vincennes from 1834 to 1898, and the Diocese of Indianapolis from 1898 to 1944.

Early mission (1675–1834)
The origins of the Catholic mission churches in the area that is now Indiana date to the late seventeenth century, when the Catholic parishes in the area were under the authority of the Diocese of Quebec. It is believed that French Jesuit missionaries first arrived in the area that included present-day Vincennes, Indiana, around 1675. Vincennes was the first seat for the episcopal see. The earliest Catholic church at Vincennes was established around 1732 as Saint Francis Xavier, and served as the cathedral church for the Diocese of Vincennes from 1834 to 1898. Father Sebastian Louis Meurin, Saint Francis Xavier's first resident priest, arrived in May 1748. The parish's earliest records date from April 21, 1749. Following Father Meurin's departure from Vincennes in 1753, several itinerant priests visited the Catholic parish, including Father Pierre Gibault, who served as resident priest at Saint Francis Xavier from 1785 to 1789. In these early years, the Catholic communities in the area experienced hardships during the American Revolution, conflicts with Native Americans, and suffered from epidemics that swept through the frontier. They also lacked financial resources and sufficient priests.

On November 6, 1789, Pope Pius VI erected the Diocese of Baltimore, the first Catholic diocese in the United States, and the area that became Indiana fell under the authority of John Carroll, Bishop of Baltimore. In 1791 Bishop Carroll sent Father Benedict Joseph Flaget to succeed Father Gibault at the fledgling Saint Francis Xavier Parish. Father Flaget, who arrived at Vincennes in 1792, opened a school and held classes at Saint Francis Xavier before he was recalled to Baltimore in 1795. John Francis Rivet, who came to Vincennes in 1796 as Father Flaget's successor, received an annual teacher's salary of $200 from the U.S. Congress, making him the first public school teacher in the Northwest Territory.

In 1808, Pope Pius VII divided the Catholic churches in the United States and its territories into five dioceses. the Catholic parishes in the northwest territories came under the jurisdiction of the Diocese of Bardstown, with Benedict Flaget appointed as its first bishop. In 1832, Bishop Flaget and Bishop Joseph Rosati, the first bishop of the Diocese of Saint Louis, Missouri, petitioned the Holy See to name Father Simon Bruté de Rémur as the first Bishop of Vincennes.

Diocese of Vincennes (1834–1898)

On May 6, 1834, Pope Gregory XVI issued a Papal Bull to erect the Diocese of Vincennes, the first episcopal see in Indiana. Father Bruté was consecrated as the first Bishop of Vincennes on October 28, 1834, at Saint Louis. At the time of his installation there were only three priests in his diocese, which covered all of Indiana and the eastern third of Illinois.

Bishop Bruté made a point to visit each Catholic family in the new diocese, regardless of the distance from his rectory at Vincennes. In 1837, he founded a college at Vincennes, and connected it to a local theological seminary that had been established under the Eudists. Bishop Bruté's devotion to the diocese also contributed to his demise. He became ill while attending a provincial council in Baltimore, Maryland. The illness weakened the bishop's immune system, but he continued his duties until his death at Vincennes on June 26, 1839.

Father Célestine Guynemer de la Hailandière, Bishop Bruté's vicar general, was consecrated as Bishop of Vincennes on August 18, 1839. Among the new bishop's most significant achievements were completing Saint Francis Xavier Cathedral, which he consecrated on August 8, 1841, and construction of a library at Vincennes to house Bishop Bruté's collection of more than 5,000 books and religious documents. Under Bishop Hailandière's leadership the diocese also expanded its services. The Sisters of Providence established its order within the diocese and the Brothers of the Holy Cross to established schools for boys. Father Edward Sorin, founder of the University of Notre Dame, and Mother Théodore Guérin, founder of Sisters of Providence of Saint Mary-of-the-Woods, also joined Bishop Hailandière in Indiana. Despite Bishop Hailandière's efforts, Indiana's population grew slowly and the institutions he helped to establish experienced many problems. In 1843 the diocese was divided and the Illinois portion became the Diocese of Chicago. Bishop Hailandière resigned in 1847.

John Stephen Bazin, Bishop Hailandière's successor, was appointed Bishop of Vincennes on September 3, 1847. Bishop Bazin's consecration took place at Saint Francis Xavier Cathedral on October 24, 1847, making him the first bishop to be ordained in Indiana. Poor health shortened his service to the diocese. The new bishop quickly appointed Jacques Maurice de St. Palais, his  vicar general, as the diocesan administrator. Bishop Bazin died at Vincennes on April 23, 1848, having served the diocese for six months.

Bishop Bazin's successor, Jacques Maurice de St. Palais, was consecrated as Bishop of Vincennes on January 14, 1849, at Vincennes. During his tenure as bishop, St. Palais had to contend with unresolved monetary issues from Hailandière's episcopacy, a cholera epidemic, and expanding the educational and ministerial opportunities within the diocese. In 1849, Mother Theodore Guerin established an orphanage in Vincennes, and in 1853, monks from Einsiedeln, Switzerland, founded Saint Meinrad abbey and seminary in southern Indiana, but plans to open a school for African Americans were never carried out. In 1857, the Holy See established the Diocese of Fort Wayne, a suffragan diocese in the northern half of Indiana at Fort Wayne.

During the American Civil War, Bishop St. Palais had to contend with the call for soldiers, and several priests from the diocese served as chaplains. In 1864, one priest from the diocese, Father Ernest Audran, was drafted as a soldier. Bishop St. Palais did not address the topic of the Emancipation Proclamation because he feared that doing so would venture too far into politics.

Although Bishop St. Palais recognized that Indianapolis had become a major city (the eighth largest in the United States by 1870), he deferred the decision to move the seat of the diocese to his successor, Silas Chatard. At the time of the bishop's death in 1877, the diocese had grown to include 151 churches, 117 priests, and 90,000 parishioners.

Silas Chatard, Indiana's first American-born bishop, was consecrated as Bishop of Vincennes in Rome, Italy, on May 12, 1878. Bishop Chatard also obtained permission from Pope Leo XIII to move the bishop's residence and diocesan chancery to Indianapolis in 1878, but the episcopal see remained at Vincennes. Anticipating the eventual relocation of the episcopal see to Indianapolis, Bishop Chatard established Saints Peter and Paul Parish as a new parish on the city's near north side, where he planned to construct a new cathedral. Chatard's tenure as bishop was also marked by his poor health.

Diocese of Indianapolis (1898–1944)
On March 28, 1898, Pope Leo XIII transferred the episcopal see from Vincennes to Indianapolis, and it became the Diocese of Indianapolis. Bishop Chatard was the first Bishop of Indianapolis. Saint John the Evangelist Church in Indianapolis served as the pro-cathedral of the diocese until Saints Peter and Paul Cathedral was completed in 1907. Bishop Chatard, who was paralyzed by a stroke in 1900, died on September 7, 1918, at Indianapolis.

Bishop Chatard's successor, Joseph Chartrand, expanded the educational opportunities for young children in the diocese, which opened more than 25 elementary and secondary schools in Chartrand's first 14 years as bishop. When Bishop Chartrand died in 1933, the diocese had 126 parochial schools and 19 secondary schools.
He also faced much adversity, such as the outbreak of World War I and the rise of Communism. Bishop Chartrand dealt with threats from the Ku Klux Klan by publishing a list of Klan members in the Indianapolis Times newspaper. During the Great Depression he exempted the entire diocese from fasting, with the exception of Fridays during Lent.  (He was appointed Archbishop of Cincinnati, and Bishop John McNicholas appointed Bishop of Indianapolis, in 1925, but Bishop Chartrand declined the Cincinnati appointment.  So, the two Bishops switched places, with Bishop Chartrand being reappointed to Indianapolis.)

Archdiocese of Indianapolis (1944–present)
Joseph Elmer Ritter, who served as auxiliary bishop and vicar general for the diocese, succeeded Chartrand as Bishop of Indianapolis in March 1934. In 1937, seventeen years before Brown v. Board of Education (1954), the landmark U.S. Supreme Court decision that declared segregation in public schools unconstitutional, Bishop Ritter ordered the integration of three girls' schools in the diocese to allow enrollment for students of all races. In 1942, he integrated the Catholic high school in Evansville, Indiana.

In October 1944, Pope Pius XII elevated the Diocese of Indianapolis to a metropolitan archdiocese. Bishop Ritter was named the first Archbishop of Indianapolis. The Pope also founded the Diocese of Evansville and the Diocese of Lafayette, two suffragan sees in Indiana. In 1946, Archbishop Ritter left Indianapolis to become Archbishop of Saint Louis; he became a Cardinal Priest in 1961.

Archbishop Paul Clarance Schulte led the archdiocese from 1946 until 1970, and was called to Rome for the Second Vatican Council. He was known for his humility, for building three high schools in the Indianapolis area and seventeen churches in the archdiocese, and for his leadership during the tumultuous 1960s. On December 17, 1956, during Schulte's tenure as Archbishop of Indianapolis, the Diocese of Gary was erected in northwestern Indiana. Archbishop Schulte resigned from the post in Indianapolis in 1970. Upon his retirement in 1984, he was the oldest and longest-serving bishop in the United States. George Joseph Biskup, who became Archbishop of Indianapolis in 1970, established the first Priests Senate in order to expedite decisions and encourage communications between the archbishop and the priests within the archdiocese.

Edward T. O'Meara, who was installed as the Archbishop of Indianapolis in 1980, reorganized the archdiocesan offices and consolidated many of them into one location at the former Cathedral High School, across the street from Saints Peter and Paul Cathedral in Indianapolis. The renovated school was renamed the Catholic Center. Archbishop O'Meara was also concerned about the shortage of priests within the archdiocese. Although the archbishop did not believe that ordination female clergy was a solution to the problem, he appointed women to key roles. Archbishop O'Meara also supported pro-life issues and the needs of the poor. The archdiocese celebrated its 150th anniversary in 1984.

Archbishop O'Meara's successor, Daniel M. Buechlein, became Archbishop of Indianapolis in September 1992. He continued his ministry of devotion to pro-life issues, Catholic education, and poor relief. Because of his focus on education, the news media designated him the "education bishop." Pope Benedict XVI appointed Christopher Coyne to assist the ailing Buechlein with his duties in March 2011, and on September 21, 2011, the Holy See granted Archbishop Buechlein an early retirement at the age of 73, due to health issues. Auxiliary Bishop Coyne served as Apostolic Administrator until October 2012, when Joseph Tobin was appointed Archbishop of Indianapolis.

Archbishop-designate Charles C. Thompson was appointed Archbishop of Indianapolis by Pope Francis on June 13, 2017. His Installation Mass was on Friday, 28 July 2017, when he also received the Pallium, the insignia of his role as Metropolitan of the Indiana Province. A Catholic high school teacher in a same-sex marriage was fired and afterward sued the Archdiocese of Indianapolis on July 10, 2019, for discrimination and interfering with his teaching contract. They had reached a settlement in which the school will help with future employment opportunities. Meanwhile, the archdiocese said Brebeuf Jesuit Preparatory School in Indianapolis is no longer recognized as a Catholic institution due to its refusal to fire a teacher in a same-sex marriage.

Patronage
The patron saints of the Archdiocese of Indianapolis are Saints Francis Xavier and Theodora Guerin. Saint Francis Xavier was the patron of the first cathedral of the diocese, and therefore also of the diocese. Saint Theodora Guerin was the first saint canonized from the archdiocese and was recognized as patroness of the archdiocese in 2006.

Cathedral

Since 1834 three parish churches have served as diocesan cathedrals or as pro-cathedrals. Saint Francis Xavier in Vincennes was the cathedral for the diocese from 1834 to 1898. Saint John the Evangelist Church in Indianapolis served as the pro-cathedral for the diocese from 1878 to 1906. Saints Peter and Paul Cathedral in Indianapolis began its service as the cathedral church in 1906.

Saint Francis Xavier Cathedral

Saint Francis Xavier Basilica, a Greek Revival-style church, dates to 1826, making it the oldest Catholic church in Indiana. It is similar in design to the Bardstown Cathedral in Kentucky. Pope Paul VI elevated the historic cathedral to the status of a minor basilica in 1970.

The cornerstone for Saint Francis Xavier Church was laid on March 30, 1826. The first services were held in the new church during the summer of 1827, although the interior was not yet complete. A bell tower designed by the architect Jean-Marie Marsile was added in the 1830s.

On May 6, 1834, when Pope Gregory XVI issued a Papal Bull to erect the Diocese of Vincennes, Saint Francis Xavier became the cathedral church for the new diocese. The church was still unfinished when Bishop Bruté, the first Bishop of Vincennes, arrived  in 1834. Bishop Hailandière continued work to complete the cathedral, which he consecrated  on August 8, 1841. Saint Francis Xavier served as the diocesan cathedral until 1898, when the episcopal see was transferred to Indianapolis. The remains of the first four Bishops of Vincennes (Bruté, Hailandière, Bazin, and St. Palais) are buried in Saint Francis Xavier's crypt.

The cathedral's interior features three large murals painted in 1870 by Wilhelm Lamprecht, a German artist. These include a Crucifixion scene, the Virgin Mary with the patron saints of the first four bishops of Vincennes (Saints Simon, Celestine, Stephen, and Maurice), and Saint Francis Xavier, the parish's patron saint. Fourteen oil paintings from France were procured for the Stations of the Cross.

Saint John the Evangelist Church

In the early 1870s, when Bishop St. Palais visited Indianapolis, he resided at Saint John the Evangelist Church's rectory and used the parish church as the pro-cathedral for the diocese. His successor, Bishop Silas Chatard, formally obtained permission from Pope Leo XIII to establish the bishop's residence and chancery at Indianapolis in 1878. When Bishop Chatard moved to Indianapolis, many considered Saint John as a diocesan cathedral, but it was never officially named as such. Saint Francis Xavier Cathedral remained the official cathedral and Vincennes as the see city for the diocese until March 28, 1898, when Pope Leo XIII officially transferred the episcopal see to Indianapolis and it became the Diocese of Indianapolis.

The rectory at Saint John served as the bishop's residence from August 1878 until April 18, 1892, when Bishop Chatard moved into the new rectory at Fourteenth and Meridian Streets in Indianapolis. The rectory at Saint John continued to house the diocesan chancery until 1968, and it served as the metropolitan tribunal for the diocese until 1982.

Saint John Church is the main structure in a cluster of parish buildings on the southwest corner of Georgia Street and Capitol Avenue in Indianapolis. Diedrich A. Bohlen, principal and founder of the architectural firm of D. A. Bohlen and Son, designed the rectory (1863), the present-day Saint Johns Church (1867–71) and the rectory addition (1878). Construction on Saint John Church, which includes a mix of American Romanesque Revival and French Gothic Revival architectural styles,
began in April 1867. Bishop St. Palais laid its cornerstone on July 21, 1867, and John B. Purcell, Archbishop of Cincinnati, dedicated the new church on July 2, 1871. Bohlen's son, Oscar, designed the twin spires on the towers that flank the main facade and supervised their construction. Due to the expense, the spires were not added until 1893, more than twenty years after the church's dedication.

Guy Leber, an Italian-Swiss painter from Louisville, Kentucky, painted the ceiling of the apse at Saint John with The Angels of Glory (white-robed angels and halo-crowned seraphs). L. Chovet of Paris, France, provided paintings for the Stations of the Cross. In 1971, on the centennial anniversary of its dedication, the interior of the church was refurbished with the generosity of Monsignor Charles P. Koster. In the confusion following the Second Vatican Council, the communion rail was removed, the altar was repositioned to allow the priest to face the congregation, and the baptismal font was moved to the left transept.

Saints Peter and Paul Cathedral

Saints Peter and Paul Cathedral Parish serves as the seat of the archdiocese. The parish originated in 1892, when Bishop Chatard formally established it in a residential neighborhood north of downtown Indianapolis. Construction for a chapel and rectory at Fourteenth and Meridian Streets began in 1891. The chapel was dedicated on March 25, 1892, and Bishop Chatard moved into the rectory on April 18, 1892. Anticipating the episcopal see's relocation from Vincennes to Indianapolis, Bishop Chatard purchased additional lots at Fourteenth and Meridian Streets in July 1894 to allow for additional space to build a cathedral. Saints Peter and Paul became the cathedral parish for the diocese on March 28, 1898, when Pope Leo XIII officially transferred the seat of the diocese to Indianapolis. At that time Bishop Chatard proceeded with plans to raise fund to build a new cathedral.

Saints Peter and Paul Cathedral was built between 1905 and 1907 with a temporary facade. James Renwick Jr.'s architectural firm of Renwick, Aspinwall and Russell, W. L. Coulter of New York designed the Classical Revival-style cathedral, rectory, and adjacent chapel. It is believed the design for the cathedral is modeled after Saint John Lateran in Rome, Italy. William Whetten Renwick, nephew of American architect James Renwick Jr., assumed sole responsibility for the completion of the cathedral around 1900, a few years after James's death, and simplified its design. The Indianapolis architectural firm of D. A. Bohlen and Son served as local supervisors for the construction project. The high altar of the unfinished Saints Peter and Paul Cathedral was consecrated on December 21, 1906, and the first Pontifical High Mass at the new cathedral took place on December 25, 1906. Construction of the permanent facade and twin spires was postponed due to a shortage of funds. Bishop Ritter arranged for the completion of the cathedral in 1936, when Indianapolis architect August Bohlen, son of Oscar and grandson of Diedrich Bohlen, supervised construction of the permanent facade, which was designed by Layton (Dick) DeMilt of the Bohlen architectural firm. The permanent facade was also modeled after Saint John Lateran in Rome.

The original interior of cathedral was ornately decorated. Major renovations and additions made in 1915, 1936, and 1985 have altered its appearance. William Renwick designed the cathedral's original interior decorations, including three altars, doorway and arch decoration, metal ceiling, and frames for the Stations of the Cross. D. A. Bohlen and Son designed the original baptismal fonts and dark oak furnishings. In 1936 the original murals by Edgar S. Cameron of Chicago were covered with glass mosaics that depicted an enthroned Christ in Majesty flanked by Saints Peter and Paul. Bishop Chatard commissioned Cesare Aureli, a Roman sculptor, to carve the cathedral's Blessed Mother and Child statue and the Saint Joseph statue in white Carrara marble. They were installed around 1909. Aureli's statue of Saint Frances de Sales (Bishop Chatard's patron saint) was delivered in 1911 and installed on the high altar. A life-size Crucifixion was installed above the main altar in 1915. The sanctuary also includes a copy of Antonio Montauti's Pietà. Renovations begun in 1985 were based on liturgical changes made following the Second Vatican Council. The refurbished cathedral was rededicated on May 14, 1986.

Bishop Joseph Chartrand was ordained a priest in the Saints Peter and Paul chapel on September 24, 1892, and consecrated as Bishop of Indianapolis at the cathedral on September 15, 1910. Joseph Ritter, Chartrand's successor and the first Archbishop of Indianapolis, was consecrated auxiliary bishop at the cathedral in 1933. Bishops Chatard and Chartrand were initially buried in the cathedral's crypt, but their remains were removed and interred at Calvary Cemetery in Indianapolis in 1976.

Churches

Education
The archdiocese contains two Catholic colleges, two seminaries, seven Catholic high schools, and 60 Catholic elementary schools.

Circa 2008 the system had about 24,000 students. The archdiocese established the Cristo Rey Project with the Sisters of Providence, for low income students, in fall 2006.

High schools
The following schools are operated under the auspices of the archdiocese:
 Bishop Chatard High School, Indianapolis
 Cardinal Ritter High School, Indianapolis
 Our Lady of Providence Junior-Senior High School, Clarksville
 Roncalli High School, Indianapolis
 Father Thomas Scecina Memorial High School, Indianapolis
 Seton Catholic High School, Richmond
 Father Michael Shawe Memorial High School, Madison

The following schools are operated under the auspices of religious institutes:
 Cathedral High School, Indianapolis
 Oldenburg Academy of the Immaculate Conception, Oldenburg
 Providence Cristo Rey High School, Indianapolis

Colleges
 Marian University, Indianapolis
 Site of Bishop Simon Bruté College Seminary
 Saint Mary-of-the-Woods College, Saint-Mary-of-the-Woods, IN
 Saint Meinrad Seminary

Archabbey

St. Meinrad Archabbey, a Benedictine Monastery; serves the archdiocese as a seminary and lay graduate school of theology. It was founded in 1854 by monks from the Einsiedeln Abbey in Switzerland in order to meet the needs of a growing German-speaking Catholic population.  In 1969, it opened its programs to lay degree-seekers during the summer for graduate level theological studies and in 1993 opened its lay program during all academic sessions.

Catholic radio
 WSPM 89.1 FM Catholic Radio Indy licensed to Cloverdale with studios in Indianapolis and a repeater:
 WSQM 90.9 FM in Noblesville

Both stations offer an audiostream from its website. www.catholicradioindy.org

Other stations outside the Archdiocese offer online streaming from the websites of:
WRDF 106.3 FM Redeemer Radio in Fort Wayne
WNOP 740 AM Sacred Heart Radio licensed to Newport, Kentucky and based in Cincinnati.
WVSG 820 AM St. Gabriel Radio in Columbus, Ohio
Radio Maria USA (based at KJMJ Alexandria, Louisiana)

Suffragan sees

Diocese of Evansville
Diocese of Fort Wayne-South Bend
Diocese of Gary
Diocese of Lafayette in Indiana

Notes

References

External links
Archdiocese of Indianapolis Official Site
The Criterion - diocesan newspaper

 
Indianapolis
Archdiocese
Indianapolis
Indianapolis
1834 establishments in Indiana
History of Catholicism in Indiana